Arnold Sigurd Kirkeby (June 12, 1901 – March 1, 1962) was an American hotelier, art collector, and real estate investor. He is now best known for owning Chartwell Mansion in the Los Angeles neighborhood of Bel Air which was the exterior set for the CBS television show The Beverly Hillbillies.

Biography 
Kirkeby was born in Chicago, Illinois, the son of Norwegian immigrants. He was married to Carlotta Cuesta (1906–1985), the daughter of Angel LaMadrid Cuesta, founder of the Cuesta-Rey Cigar Company based in Tampa, Florida.

Kirkeby was the founder of the Kirkeby Hotel chain, beginning in Chicago with the Drake Hotel, and ending his hotel interests when he sold the Beverly Wilshire in Beverly Hills, California. After selling the hotel chain and its Chicago ties, he then invested in the Janss Investment Company development of Westwood, Los Angeles, California, in 1959. As part of this project, Kirkeby broke ground on the Kirkeby Center on Wilshire Boulevard in 1960, but died before the building was completed.  Kirkeby Center is now known as the Occidental Petroleum Building, and is the home of the Armand Hammer Museum.

Television fans will note that Kirkeby owned the stately mansion located at 750 Bel Air Road in Bel Air, California, used for exterior shots in the hit CBS sitcom The Beverly Hillbillies.  Series producer Paul Henning paid the family (Mr. Kirkeby had been killed in a plane crash prior to the series debut) $500 per day for filming on the mansion's grounds. The mansion's interior and rear were duplicated on Stage 4 at General Service Studios. Contractual provisions at the time prevented disclosure of the mansion's address in press releases, and required restoration of the grounds after each shoot. The mansion had been previously used by Jerry Lewis in the 1960 film Cinderfella.

Kirkeby died aboard American Airlines Flight 1 when it crashed shortly after takeoff from New York City.

Hotels 

The Kirkeby Hotel organization included:

California
Beverly Wilshire Hotel, Beverly Hills, California
The Town House, Los Angeles, California
Sunset Tower, West Hollywood, California

Florida
The Kenilworth, Miami Beach, Florida
Belleview-Biltmore Hotel, Clearwater, Florida

Illinois
The Blackstone Hotel, Chicago, Illinois
The Drake, Chicago, Illinois

New York
The Gotham, New York, New York
Hampshire House, New York, New York
The Sherry-Netherland, New York, New York
The Warwick, New York, New York
Saranac Inn, Saranac Lake, New York

New Jersey
Hotel Ambassador, Atlantic City, New Jersey: Rebuilt as the Tropicana Casino

Pennsylvania
The Warwick, Philadelphia, Pennsylvania

Cuba
Hotel Nacional de Cuba, Havana, Cuba

Panama
El Panama Hotel, Panama City, Panama

References

External links
 

1901 births
1962 deaths
American hoteliers
American real estate businesspeople
Businesspeople from Chicago
Accidental deaths in New York (state)
20th-century American businesspeople
American people of Norwegian descent
Victims of aviation accidents or incidents in 1962
Victims of aviation accidents or incidents in the United States